Year 340 (CCCXL) was a leap year starting on Tuesday (link will display the full calendar) of the Julian calendar. At the time, it was known as the Year of the Consulship of Acindynus and Valerius (or, less frequently, year 1093 Ab urbe condita). The denomination 340 for this year has been used since the early medieval period, when the Anno Domini calendar era became the prevalent method in Europe for naming years.

Events 
 By place 

 Roman Empire 
 Constantinople, capital of Emperor Constantius II, becomes the largest city in the world, taking the lead from Rome, capital of his brother Constans I.
 Constantine II, emperor of the western part of the Roman Empire (Britain, Gaul, the Rhine provinces and Iberia), crosses the Alps and attacks the army of his brother Constans I, emperor of the central part of the Roman Empire (Upper Danube, Italy and middle Africa). They clash at Aquileia in northern Italy. Constantine is killed in a skirmish by an ambush of Constans' troops. 
 Constans is left sole ruler of the Western Roman Empire, with his other brother, Constantius II, emperor of the Eastern Roman Empire.

 By topic 

 Religion 
 Pope Julius I inveighs against Arianism at the Council of Rome.
 Acacius succeeds Eusebius as bishop in the see of Caesarea.
 Wulfila evangelizes among the Goths for 7 years.

Births 
 Aurelius Ambrose, bishop of Milan  (approximate date)
 Amphilochius, bishop of Iconium (approximate date)
 Jerome, priest and Bible translator (approximate date)
 Justina, Roman empress and regent (approximate date)
 Peter of Sebaste, bishop of Armenia (approximate date)
 Quintus Aurelius Symmachus, Roman consul (d. 402)

Deaths 
 October 28 – Cunera (or Kunera), Christian martyr
 Constantine II, Roman consul and emperor (b. 316)
 Kui An, Indian general and minister of Later Zhao
 Macrina the Elder, Christian saint (approximate date)
 Tao Bao (or Anbu), Chinese general of Later Zhao
 Yu Liang (or Yuangui), Chinese general (b. 279)

References